Kurose Hole is a submarine caldera located between Mikurajima and Hachijōjima in the Izu Islands chain. The caldera is 600–760 m deep and 5–7 km wide.

See also
List of volcanoes in Japan

References

Submarine volcanoes
Izu–Bonin–Mariana Arc
Subduction volcanoes
Calderas of Japan
Volcanoes of Tokyo